MOSFET Gate Driver is a specialized circuit that is used to drive the gate (gate driver) of power MOSFETs effectively and efficiently in high-speed switching applications. The addition of high-speed MOSFET Gate drivers are the last step if the turn-on is intended to fully enhance the conducting channel of the MOSFET technology.

MOSFET technology
The Gate Driver works under the same principle as the MOSFET transistor. It provides an output current that provides a charge to the semiconductor by a control electrode. It is also simple to drive and has resistive nature for power uses.

References

Electronic circuits
MOSFETs